Abdul Halim bin Zainal (born 29 July 1988 in Seremban, Negeri Sembilan) is a Malaysian footballer who plays for Negeri Sembilan in Malaysia Premier League.

He is the younger brother of former Malaysia international player, Faizal Zainal and Khairil Zainal.

He started to impress in 2010 season where he help Negeri Sembilan to reach Malaysian Cup final and win FA Cup. He also win the 2011 Malaysia Cup with Negeri Sembilan. In 2012 he also help Negeri Sembilan to win Piala Sultan Haji Ahmad Shah cup. He has shown his great abilities in midfield area.

Club career

Selangor
Halim signed a contract with Selangor in 2017.

Career statistics

Club

1 Includes AFC Cup and AFC Champions League.

References

External links
 
 Halim Zainal Statistics
Living people
1988 births
Malaysian footballers
People from Negeri Sembilan
Negeri Sembilan FA players
Kelantan FA players
Sime Darby F.C. players
Malaysia Super League players
Malaysian people of Malay descent
Malaysian Muslims
Association football midfielders